"Ender's Game" is a science fiction novelette by American writer Orson Scott Card.  It first appeared in the August 1977 issue of Analog magazine and was later expanded into the 1985 novel Ender's Game.  Although it serves as the foundation of the Ender's Game series, the novelette is not considered to be properly a part of the Ender's Game universe, as there are many discrepancies in continuity between it and the novel.

Plot summary
This story begins as Ender is made the commander of Dragon Army at Battle School, an institution designed to make young children into military commanders against an unspecified enemy. Armies are groups of students that fight mock battles in the Battle Room, a null gravity environment, and are subdivided into "toons".  Due to Ender's genius in leadership, Dragon Army dominates the competition.  After his nineteenth consecutive victory, Ender is told that his Army is being broken up and his toon leaders made commanders in their turn, while he is transferred to Command School for the next stage of his education.  Here, veteran Maezr Rackham tutors him in the use of a space battle simulator.  Eventually, many of his former toon leaders serve under him once more.  Once familiar with the simulator, they fight a series of what Maezr tells them are mock battles against a computer-controlled enemy.  Ender's team wins again and again, finally destroying a planet that the enemy fleet seems to be protecting.  Once the battle is over, Maezr tells Ender that all battles were real, the children's commands having been relayed to the extant fleet, and that he has destroyed the enemy's home world and ended the war.

Characters

Children
Ender Wiggins – commander of Dragon Army
Bean – toon leader in Dragon Army and at Command School
Ren – toon leader in Dragon Army
Peder – toon leader in Dragon Army and at Command School
Brian – toon leader in Dragon Army
Wins – toon leader in Dragon Army and at Command School
Younger – toon leader in Dragon Army and at Command School
Lee – toon leader at Command School
Vlad – toon leader at Command School
Carn Carby – commander of Rabbit Army
Pol Slattery – commander of Leopard Army
William Bee – commander of Griffin Army

Adults
Captain Graff
Lieutenant Anderson
Lieutenant Morris
Maezr Rackham
Teachers at Command School – unnamed
Medic at Command School – unnamed
Observers during the final battle – unnamed

Relationship to the novel
This novelette was later expanded into the 1985 novel Ender's Game.  Although the basic plot is the same, the novel changes some elements, and introduces many others. In the novel, Ender's surname changes from "Wiggins" to "Wiggin", and the name of his "teacher" changes from "Maezr" to "Mazer". The novel supplies a detailed background for Ender and the interstellar conflict with the buggers (in later novels referred to as Formics); the novelette supplies virtually no background whatsoever; the terms "Earth" and "human" do not occur at all, and the enemy remains nameless and faceless.

In the novel, Battle School is a space station orbiting Earth, and Command School inside the asteroid Eros; in the novelette, the former is a terrestrial building and the latter an orbital space station.

In addition, several characters are changed: the antagonist Bonzo Madrid replaces Pol Slattery as the commander who loses to Ender during an unfair battle. Carn Carby is written as a much more supportive character. In the novelette, Ender says to Bean, "How can they put you under an idiot like Carn Carby!" while the novel instead has him say "Carn Carby's a good man. I hope he recognizes you for what you're worth".

In the novel, the final chapter introduces the sequel Speaker for the Dead.

Publication
Analog Science Fiction and Fact, August 1977
Unaccompanied Sonata and Other Stories, Dial Press, 1980
The Future at War vol. 2: The Spear of Mars, Ace Books, 1980
Analog Readers' Choice, Dial Press, 1981
Unaccompanied Sonata and Other Stories, Dell, 1981, with an introduction by Ben Bova discussing "Ender's Game" and the "discovery" of Card.
Analog Anthology #2, Davis Publications, 1982
There Will Be War, Tor Books, 1983
Battlefields Beyond Tomorrow: Science Fiction War Stories, Bonanza Books, 1987
Maps in a Mirror, Tor Books, 1990
First Meetings, Subterranean Press, 2002
The Prentice Hall Anthology of Science Fiction and Fantasy, Prentice-Hall 2003

Notes

References

External links
 
"Ender's Game" e-text
About the story "Ender's Game" – from Card’s website
Publication history for "Ender's Game" – from Card's website
 Ender's Game. Mormon Literature & Creative Arts Database.

Ender's Game series short stories
Short stories by Orson Scott Card
1977 short stories
Works originally published in Analog Science Fiction and Fact
Works about child soldiers